Skudra was a province (satrapy) of the Persian Achaemenid Empire in Europe between 510s BC and 479 BC. Its name is attested in Persian and Egyptian inscriptions (an Egyptian record of c. 498–497 BC, and a list on the tomb of Darius the Great at Naqsh-e Rustam, c. 486 BC.). It is believed to have comprised the lands now known as Thrace and Macedon (which would correspond to parts of the regions of present-day Northern Greece and Eastern Bulgaria).

Name

History
The first Achaemenid military incursion in southeast Europe started in 513 BCE, when the Achaemenid king Darius I amassed an army and marched from Achaemenid-ruled Anatolia into Thrace, and from there he crossed the Arteskos river and then proceeded through the valley-route of the Hebros river. This was an act of conquest by Darius I, who during his march sent emissaries to the Thracians found on the path of his army as well as to the many other Thracian tribes over a wide area. All these peoples of Thrace, including the Odrysae, submitted to the Achaemenid king until his army reached the territory of Thracian tribe of the Getae who lived just south of the Danube river and who in vain attempted to resist the Achaemenid conquest. After the resistance of the Getae was defeated and they were forced to provide the Achaemenid army with soldiers, all the Thracian tribes between the Aegean Sea and the Danube river had been subjected by the Achaemenid Empire. Once Darius had reached the Danube, he crossed the river and campaigned against the Scythians, after which he returned back to Anatolia through Thrace and left a large army in Europe under the command of his general Megabazus.

Following Darius I's orders to create a new satrapy for the Achaemenid Empire in the Balkans, Megabazus forced the Greek cities who had refused to submit to the Achaemenid Empire, starting with Perinthus, after which led military campaigns throughout Thrace to impose Achaemenid rule over every city and tribe in the area. With the help of Thracian guides, Megabazus was able to conquer Paeonia up to but not including the area of Lake Prasias, and he gave the lands of the Paeonians inhabiting these regions up to the Lake Prasias to Thracians loyal to the Achaemenid Empire. The last endeavours of Megabazus included the conquest of the area between the Strymon and Axius rivers, and at the end of his campaign, the king of Macedonia, Amyntas I, accepted to become a vassal of the Achaemenid Empire. Within the satrapy itself, the Achaemenid king Darius granted to the tyrant Histiaeus of Miletus the district of Myrcinus on the Strymon's east bank until Megabazus persuaded him to recall Histiaeus after he returned to Asia Minor, after which the Thracian tribe of the Edoni retook control of Myrcinus. Otanes then proceeded to capture Byzantium, Chalcedon, Antandrus, Lamponeia, Imbros, and Lemnos for the Achaemenid Empire.

The area included within the satrapy of  included both the Aegean coast of Thrace, as well as its Pontic coast till the Danube. In the interior, the Western border of the satrapy consisted of the Axius river and the Belasica-Pirin-Rila mountain ranges till the site of modern-day Kostenets. The importance of this satrapy rested in that it contained the Hebros river, where a route in the river valley connected the permanent Persian settlement of Doriscus with the Aegean coast, as well as with the port-cities of Apollonia, Mesembria and Odessos on the Black Sea, and with the central Thracian plain, which gave this region an important strategic value. Persian sources describe the province as being populated by three groups: the Saka Paradraya ("Saka beyond the sea", the Persian term for all Scythian peoples to the north of the Caspian and Black Seas ); the  themselves (most likely the Thracian tribes), and Yauna Takabara. The latter term, which translates as "Ionians with shield-like hats", is believed to refer to Macedonians. The three ethnicities (Saka, Macedonian, Thracian) enrolled in the Achaemenid army, as shown in the Imperial tomb reliefs of Naqsh-e Rostam, and participated in the Second Persian invasion of Greece on the Achaemenid side.

When Achaemenid control over its European possessions collapsed once the Ionian Revolt started, the Thracians did not help the Greek rebels, and they instead saw Achaemenid rule as more favourable because the latter had treated the Thracians with favour and even given them more land, and also because they realised that Achaemenid rule was a bulwark against Greek expansion and Scythian attacks. During the revolt, Aristagoras of Miletus captured Myrcinus from the Edones and died trying to attack another Thracian city.

Mardonius was however attacked at night by the Bryges in the area of Lake Doiran and modern-day Valandovo, but he was able to defeat and submit them as well. Herodotus's list of tribes who provided the Achaemenid army with soldiers included Thracians from both the coast and from the central Thracian plain, attesting that Mardonius's campaign had reconquered all the Thracian areas which were under Achaemenid rule before the Ionian Revolt.

The Thracians kept on sending supplies to the governor of Eion when the Greeks besieged it. When the city fell to the Greeks in 475 BCE, Cimon gave its land to Athens for colonisation. Although Athens was now in control of the Aegean Sea and the Hellespont following the defeat of the Persian invasion, the Persians were still able to control the southern coast of Thrace from a base in central Thrace and with the support of the Thracians. Thanks to the Thracians co-operating with the Persians by sending supplies and military reinforcements down the Hebrus river route, Achaemenid authority in central Thrace lasted until around 465 BCE, and the governor Mascames managed to resist many Greek attacks in Doriscus until then. Around this time, Teres I, the king of the Odrysae tribe, in whose territory the Hebrus flowed, was starting to organise the rise of his kingdom into a powerful state.

With the end of Achaemenid power in the Balkans, the Thracian Odrysian kingdom, the kingdom of Macedonia, and the Athenian thalassocracy filled the ensuing power vacuum and formed their own spheres of influence in the area.

See also
Scythian campaign of Darius I
Achaemenid Macedonia
Doriscus
Eion
Boryza (city)
Ionia (satrapy)
Kausia
Skydra

Notes

 
 
 
Achaemenid satrapies